Richard Harold Kirk (21 March 1956 – 21 September 2021) was an English musician who specialised in electronic music. His career began as a co-founder of the influential industrial music band Cabaret Voltaire, formed in 1973. He subsequently released projects under his own name and a number of aliases, and was a member of various groups such as Sweet Exorcist. Kirk was considered a major figure in the creation of industrial music.

Background
Kirk first came to prominence in the 1970s as a member of the seminal industrial band Cabaret Voltaire. He cited a wide range of musicians, including Stockhausen, John Cage and Fela Kuti, as inspiring his work.

Kirk's first release as a solo artist, Disposable Half-Truths, was released in 1980 and he maintained a career as a solo artist alongside Cabaret Voltaire until the band's dissolution in 1994. He reformed the band in 2014 as the sole remaining member, performing sporadically with all-new material more akin to his solo work than the output of the original incarnation of Cabaret Voltaire.

During the 1990s, his solo output increased considerably. Kirk's works explored multiple types of electronic/dance music under many pseudonyms. His prolific work resulted in AllMusic calling him contemporary techno's busiest man.

Kirk died on 21 September 2021, at the age of 65.

Aliases
In addition to solo releases under his own name, Kirk used the following aliases:

Collaborations
The following is a list of groups and artists Kirk has worked with:
Acid Horse
Cabaret Voltaire
Citrus
Kora
Peter Hope
The Pressure Company
Sweet Exorcist
The Tivoli
XON

Partial discography

Albums
 Disposable Half-Truths (1980, Industrial)
 Time High Fiction (1983, Doublevision)
 Black Jesus Voice (1986, Rough Trade)
 Ugly Spirit (1986, Rough Trade)
 Hoodoo Talk (with Peter Hope) (1988, Wax Trax!)
 Virtual State (1993, Warp)
 The Number of Magic (1995, Warp)
 Agents with false memories (1996, Ash International)
 Knowledge Through Science (1998, Blast First)
 Darkness At Noon (1999, Touch)
 LoopStatic (Amine ß Ring Modulations) (2000, Touch)
 TWAT v4.0: The War Against Terror (2003, Intone)
 Earlier/Later—Unreleased Projects Anthology ’74–’89 (2004, Mute/EMI)
 Richard H. Kirk Meets the Truck Bombers of Suburbia Uptown Vol. 1 (Feat. Pat Riot) (2004, Intone) 
 Sonic Reflections (Unreleased Soundtrack Project 1994) (2009, Intone)
 Reality Is Opposite (2011, Intone)
 Anonymized (2011, Intone)
 Dasein (2017, Intone)

As Sandoz
Digital Lifeforms (1993, Touch)
Intensely Radioactive (1994, Touch)
Every Man Got Dreaming (1995, Touch)
Dark Continent (1996, Touch)
God Bless the Conspiracy (1997, Alphaphone)
In Dub: Chant to Jah (1998, Touch; 2002, Soul Jazz)
Afrocentris (2001, Intone)
Live in the Earth: Sandoz in Dub Chapter 2 (2006, Soul Jazz)
Acid Editions (303 Excursions) (2009, Intone)
Digital Life Time (2012, Intone)

As Electronic Eye
Closed Circuit (1994, Beyond)
The Idea of Justice (1995, Beyond)
Neurometrik (2000, Alphaphone)
Autoshark (2006, Intone)

12-inch singles
 "Leather Hands" (with Peter Hope)
 "Surgeons" (with Peter Hope)
 "Hipnotic"

References

External links

 Interview with Richard H. Kirk by André Éric Létourneau- Canadian Broadcasting Corporation

1956 births
2021 deaths
English electronic musicians
English experimental musicians
English keyboardists
English record producers
Remixers
Industrial Records artists
Rough Trade Records artists
Mute Records artists
Warp (record label) artists
Musicians from Sheffield
Blast First artists
Cabaret Voltaire (band) members